K Karunakaran ministry (24 May 1982 – 25 March 1987) was the 7th Kerala Legislative Assembly ministry that was led by K. Karunakaran. The Ministry was a re-structured a few times

Ministers

See also 
 Chief Ministers of Kerala
 Kerala Ministers

References

Karunakaran 03
Indian National Congress state ministries
Indian National Congress of Kerala
1982 establishments in Kerala
1987 disestablishments in India
Cabinets established in 1982
Cabinets disestablished in 1987